Taylor Glacier is a small cirque glacier in Rocky Mountain National Park in the U.S. state of Colorado. Taylor Glacier is on the east side of the Continental Divide and adjacent to Taylor Peak. Taylor Glacier is both an ice and a rock glacier, with the lower portions of the glacier being composed primarily of rock debris and a small portion of ice.

See also
List of glaciers in the United States

References

Glaciers of Rocky Mountain National Park
Landforms of Larimer County, Colorado